Vasa Mijić (born 11 April 1973) is a Serbian volleyball player, who won the gold medal with the Yugoslavian Men's National Team at the 2000 Summer Olympics. Standing at 1.86 m, he played as a libero.

Career
Mijić was named Best Digger at the 2001 European Championship in Ostrava, where the national squad claimed the gold medal. He was a member of the national team representing Serbia and Montenegro at the 2004 Summer Olympics.

Individual awards
 2001 European Championship "Best Digger"

References
 Serbian Olympic Committee

1973 births
Living people
Yugoslav men's volleyball players
Serbia and Montenegro men's volleyball players
Serbian men's volleyball players
Olympiacos S.C. players
Olympic volleyball players of Yugoslavia
Olympic volleyball players of Serbia and Montenegro
Olympic gold medalists for Federal Republic of Yugoslavia
Olympic medalists in volleyball
Volleyball players at the 2000 Summer Olympics
Volleyball players at the 2004 Summer Olympics
Sportspeople from Novi Sad
European champions for Serbia and Montenegro
Medalists at the 2000 Summer Olympics
Serbian expatriate sportspeople in Greece
Serbian expatriate sportspeople in France
Serbian expatriate sportspeople in Russia